Darío Eduardo Lopilato de la Torre (born January 29, 1981) is an Argentine actor, brother of Luisana Lopilato.

Biography 
Darío Lopilato was born to Eduardo Lopilato and Beatriz de la Torre. He has an older sister, actress and nutriotioner , and a younger sister, actress and model Luisana Lopilato. He is of Spanish and Italian descent; his great-grandfather was an immigrant from Muro Lucano, province of Potenza. Lopilato grew up in an evangelical Christian family and has stated that he is a devout Christian.

Filmography

Television

Theater

Movies

Television programs

Awards and nominations

References

External links
 

1981 births
Living people
Male actors from Buenos Aires
Argentine people of Italian descent
Argentine people of Spanish descent
Argentine male film actors
Argentine male television actors
Argentine male stage actors